Margaret Mitchell is an American lawyer, and the chief executive officer of YWCA USA.

Early life and education 
Mitchell received a bachelor's degree in mass communications from Hampton Institute, where she was briefly the student of Maya Angelou.

Career 
Mitchell was announced as the CEO of YWCA USA on October 14, 2021, with an effective start date of January 2022. Prior to this, she was president of the YWCA of Greater Cleveland for 10 years. Before working with the YWCA, she was the President and CEO of Big Brothers Big Sisters Greater Cleveland and  VP of Business Development and Director of Partnerships at Big Brothers Big Sisters of North Texas, which changed its name to BBBS Lone Star.

She previously worked at United Way and before that worked as a lawyer at Forbes, Fields & Associates law firm.

In March 2022, she was part of the White House roundtable on young women's mental health.

In 2020, she received the Dr. Martin Luther King Jr. Outstanding Service Award from the Cleveland Orchestra.

References 

YWCA leaders
Hampton University alumni
Year of birth missing (living people)
Living people